Lichtetal am Rennsteig is a former municipal association in the district of Saalfeld-Rudolstadt, in Thuringia, Germany. The seat of government was in Lichte (in the Wallendorf section). It was disbanded in January 2019.

The municipal association consisted of the following municipalities:

History 
The municipal association of Lichtetal am Rennsteig was established in line with the administrative reorganization after German reunification. Before 1990, all four municipalities were independent, each with a town hall, administration, and autonomous mayor. The post of mayor is now honorary, with reimbursement of expenses. The name Lichtetal am Rennsteig was derived from the close proximity to the Thuringian Rennsteig and the Lichte River.

Gallery

Coats of arms

Pictures

See also 
 Deesbach Forebay
 Leibis-Lichte Dam
 Municipal associations in Thuringia
 Cultural monuments in Lichte

External links
 Official website
 Rennsteig hikes individually and comfortable at Rennsteigtripp.de - hiking in Lichtetal am Rennsteig

Thuringia
Former Verwaltungsgemeinschaften in Thuringia
Lichte